Conache is a peruvian town located in Laredo District about 14 km from Trujillo city in La Libertad Region. This is set in an ancient place, which belonged to the mochica culture in the pre-Inca era. This town has sandy lands, and is washed by the Moche River, allowing currently an agricultural and livestock acceptable level. It also has remains of the ancient agriculture, and paved channels, in the area called "The Devil's pocket."

History
The town is located in the valley of the river Moche with high agricultural production. In old times its huachaques (Moche irrigations) were well used by the Indians for livestock and for hidrobiological elements. In colonial times, the first conquerors and Hispanic settlers made of Conache an agricultural and food production. It was a production place for the emerging markets of Trujillo. Currently Conache belongs to Laredo district, and is located 7 km from the city of Laredo.

Economy
Conache today is a farming village, where people cultivates corn, beans, sugar cane, vegetables and the people also dedicates to livestock, forage cultivation and animal husbandry majors and minors.

Festivals
 Carnival of Conache, is a festival held each year in the peruvian town of Conache, located nearby Trujillo city at southeast. It consists of several activities including the crowning of the queen, and a big celebration with the ancient drink called Chicha.

Tourism
 Lake Conache was seasonal and periodically it was formed during the rainy season in the area, and months after it dried, but after completing the second phase of the special project of irrigation Chavimochic, with the continuous flood irrigation of the crops in the Pampas de San Juan, the water table increased gradually by the leaks, and the lake came to have permanent water and it is growing in volume.

See also
 Trujillo
 Trujillo Province
 La Libertad Region
 Laredo District
 Lake Conache
 Carnival of Conache

References

External links

 Location of Conache (Trujillo city) (Wikimapia)
 Carnival of Conache
 Municipality of Laredo

Localities of Trujillo, Peru
Populated places in La Libertad Region